Moores Mills may refer to:
Coopersville, Clinton County, New York, formerly Moore's Mills
Moores Mills, New Brunswick